Kenogami Lake is an unincorporated place and community in the Unorganized West Part of Timiskaming District in northeastern Ontario, Canada. It is located on Kenogami Lake on the Blanche River in the Saint Lawrence River drainage basin.

Transportation

The nearby Kenogami Lake Station is on the Ontario Northland Railway main line, between Goldthorpe to the north and Swastika to the east.

References

External links
 Kenogami Lake - Highway 11

Communities in Timiskaming District